Club Atlético Pantoja is a professional football team based in Santo Domingo, Dominican Republic. Founded in 1999, the team is currently playing in the Liga Dominicana de Fútbol, the top division of Dominican football.

History

Club Atlético Pantoja was born from the a group of mostly Argentinian immigrants, led by Eduardo Macchiavello. It started in 1999, when this group met to play football at the ROWE Laboratory, located in the popular neighborhood of Pantoja in the city of Santo Domingo.

This group became larger, adding Dominicans and other nationalities. In 2001 they were invited to play a veteran tournament organized by the Dominican Football Federation. This is how the Deportivo Pantoja Fútbol Club is born.

This club became the champion of the tournament of veterans. The club went on to participate in the Third Dominican Division.

Months later, again this team became champion in its first participation in an official competition. This championship allowed them to ascend to Second Division, which involved a greater challenge.

The newly promoted Pantoja again became champion of the Second Division league, a team made up mostly by veterans. This team had achieved the feat of "champion" three consecutive times, managing to arrive to the maximum category of soccer of the Dominican Republic, the First Division. This group would propose to reach another milestone, the title of First Division. From then a technical body was hired, in addition to adding young players as reinforcements. The fusion of youth and experience led the Club to reach the maximum laureate in Dominican football: the Primera División championship.

The Club in a short time positioned itself as one of the most winning clubs of the Dominican Republic. Atlético Pantoja became the first association football club from the Dominican Republic with 10,000 followers on Facebook, their most popular social media page.

Stadium
Estadio Olímpico Félix Sánchez: 2014–

Achievements

Domestic
Liga Dominicana de Fútbol: 3
 2015, Apertura 2019, Gran Final 2019

Liga Mayor Coca-Cola: 3
 2004–05, 2009, 2011–12

Campeonato Nacional: 2
 2000–01, 2002–03

International
Caribbean Club Championship: 1
2018

Current squad

References

External links
Balompiedominicano
Federacion Dominicana De Futbol 
www.atleticopantoja.com.do
Prensa Futbol Dominicano
Fifa.com
Futbol Total (archived 2 February 2017)

 
Football clubs in the Dominican Republic
2000 establishments in the Dominican Republic
Association football clubs established in 2000